Eberhardt is a Germanic surname. It may refer to:

People
Andrei Eberhardt (1856–1919), Russian naval officer
Charles Eberhardt (1871–1965), American diplomat
Cliff Eberhardt (b. 1954), American contemporary folk singer and songwriter
Erich Eberhardt (1913–1965), German military officer
Frederick Eberhardt (1868–1946), American engineer, philanthropist, university administrator and president of Gould & Eberhardt
Georg Eberhardt (1914–1943), German military officer
Henri Eberhardt (1913–1976), French canoeist
Hugo Eberhardt (1874–1959), German architect
Isabelle Eberhardt (1877–1904), Swiss writer and explorer of North Africa
Thom Eberhardt (b. 1947), American film director, producer and screenwriter
Walter von Eberhardt (1862–1944), German general
William Eberhardt, American forger of the Dare Stones

Locations
Fitzner-Eberhardt Arid Lands Ecology Reserve, an area of the Hanford Reach National Monument, Washington, US

Companies
Otto Eberhardt Patronenfabrik, German World War II munitions and arms manufacturer

See also
 Eberhard
 Eberhart (disambiguation)

German-language surnames
Surnames from given names